Umet or Umyot may refer to:

Umet (inhabited locality) (Umyot), several inhabited localities in Russia
Metropolitan University (Puerto Rico), a university system in Puerto Rico now merged into Ana G. Méndez University
Turkish Space Systems, Integration and Test Center, a spacecraft production and testing facility in Turkey